/ was the 33rd single by the Japanese J-pop group Every Little Thing, released on October 30, 2007.

Track listing 
  (Words - Kaori Mochida / music - Kazuhito Kikuchi)
 (Words&music - Noriyuki Makihara)
   (instrumental)
 (instrumental)

Chart positions

2007 songs
Avex Trax singles
Songs written by Kaori Mochida
Every Little Thing (band) songs
2007 singles